Naimjon Tuhtaboyev (Uzbek: Naimjon To'xtaboyev; born 29 January 1993) is an Uzbek Lethwei and Muay Thai fighter who currently competes in the World Lethwei Championship (WLC), where he is the reigning WLC Middleweight World champion.

Tuhtaboyev became the WLC champion by winning a decision against Too Too at WLC 11: Battlebones in Yangon, Myanmar.

Career

Muay Thai career 
On April 19, 2013, Tuhtaboyev faced Muay Thai champion Yodsanklai Fairtex and lost by TKO in the second round two at THAI FIGHT EXTREME 2013: Pattaya.

On July 24, 2013, Tuhtaboyev took part in the 2013 Toyota Vigo Marathon 140 lbs Tournament in Phitsanulok, Thailand. In the Tournament Quarter Finals, he defeated Leonard Nganga of Kenya by decision. Advancing to the Semi Final round, he defeated John Michel Pierre via second-round technical knockout. In the Tournament Final, he faced the Muay Thai legend Saenchai, to whom he lost in a three-round decision.

Naimjon Tuhtaboyev returned to THAI FIGHT on October 27, 2013, where he faced Christophe Pruvost of Switzerland at THAI FIGHT Kard Chuek. Tuhtaboyev went on to lose by decision after three rounds.

On September 20, 2014, he faced former Isuzu Cup tournament winner Chanajon P.K. Saenchai Muaythaigym at THAI FIGHT WORLD BATTLE 2014: Vietnam in Ho Chi Minh City. The Uzbek picked up his first win in THAI FIGHT as he knocked out Chanajon in the first round with a spinning back elbow.

On October 25, 2014, Naimjon Tuhtaboyev faced Burmese Lethwei fighter Too Too under Muay Thai rules in a fight where the Uzbek narrowly won by way of a three-round decision.

Tuhtaboyev returned to THAI FIGHT on October 23, 2016 at THAI FIGHT Air Race 1 to face Sean Kearney of Canada. He lost the fight via three-round decision.

On December 23, 2017, he defeated Mohamed Houmer of France by knockout at THAI FIGHT Chiang Mai in the 2017 THAI FIGHT 70 kg Tournament Semi-Finals.

Naimjon Tuhtaboyev went on to face Saensatharn P.K. Saenchai Muaythaigym at THAI FIGHT Bangkok on January 27, 2018 in the 70 kg Tournament Final. The fight was to determine the 2017 THAI FIGHT 70 kg Champion. However, after three rounds, he lost by decision.

On March 30, 2019, Tuhtaboyev faced Chanajon P.K. Saenchai Muaythaigym at THAI FIGHT Mueang Khon 2019 in a rematch of their fight from 2014. This time, Chanajon won the fight by decision.

Lethwei career 
On October 14, 2018, Tuhtaboyev impressed in his Lethwei debut, when he won in his fight against Phyan Thway. Phyan Thway, who was known for having difficulties in cutting weight, looked significantly lighter than Tuhtaboyev. His performance caught the attention of the World Lethwei Championship (WLC) and in 2019, Tuhtaboyev signed an exclusive Lethwei contract with he promotion. Tuhtaboyev challenged undefeated, reigning WLC Middleweight Champion Too Too. On October 25, 2014, both men had fought each other under Muay Thai rules at THAI FIGHT in Thailand, with Tuhtaboyev emerging victorious by split decision. Since then, Too Too had been celebrated in his home country of Myanmar, winning the WLC Middleweight title in 2018. Meanwhile, Tuhtaboyev had been more focused on Muay Thai, having been involved in several big fights. In their Lethwei rematch, the WLC Middleweight World Championship would be on the line.

On January 31, 2020, Tuhtaboyev faced Too Too inside the Thein Pyu Stadium, with the event being streamed live on UFC Fight Pass. Both fighters were looking for the knockout, with Too Too being effective with his leg kicks and headbutts. However, Tuhtaboyev's more precise and accurate strikes proved to be the difference and earned him the victory via close split decision and he became the WLC Middleweight World Champion.

Championships and accomplishments

Lethwei 
 World Lethwei Championship
WLC Middleweight World Championship

Muay Thai 
 THAI FIGHT
2017 THAI FIGHT 70kg Tournament Runner-Up
 Bangla Stadium
2017 Bangla Stadium Middleweight Championship
 Toyota Vigo Marathon 
2013 Toyota Vigo Marathon 63.5 kg Tournament Runner-Up

Lethwei record

|- style="background:#cfc;"
| 2020-01-31 || Win || align="left" | Too Too ||  WLC 11: Battlebones ||Yangon, Myanmar || Decision (Split) || 5 || 3:00
|-
! style=background:white colspan=9 |
|- style="background:#c5d2ea;"
| 2019-11-03 || Draw || align="left" | Phyan Thway || AH-GA Golden Belt Championship || Yangon, Myanmar || Draw || 5 || 3:00
|-
| colspan=9 | Legend:

Muay Thai record 

|- style="background:#cfc;"
| 2019-07-20 || Win ||align=left|  Ismail Uzuner || Pitbull Promotion || Istanbul, Turkey || Decision || 3 || 3:00
|- style="background:#cfc;"
| 2019-04-13 || Win ||align=left|  Name unknown || DJ Harris International Muaythai 2019 || Kelantan, Malaysia || KO || 2 || 
|-  style="background:#fbb;"
| 2019-03-30 || Loss ||align=left|  Chanajon P.K. Saenchai Muaythaigym || THAI FIGHT Mueang Khon 2019 || Nakhon Si Thammarat, Thailand || Decision || 3 || 3:00
|- style="background:#fbb;"
| 2018-07-01 || Loss ||align=left| Pakorn P.K. Saenchai Muaythaigym || 8 Super Champ || Bangkok, Thailand || Decision || 3 || 3:00
|- style="background:#cfc;"
| 2018-05-26 || Win ||align=left| Shun Xu || Heroes Fighting Championship || Macau || Decision || 3 || 3:00
|- style="background:#fbb;"
| 2018-01-27|| Loss ||align=left| Saensatharn P.K. Saenchai Muaythaigym || THAI FIGHT Bangkok 2017 || Bangkok, Thailand || Decision || 3 || 3:00
|-
! style=background:white colspan=9 |
|- style="background:#cfc;"
| 2017-12-23 || Win ||align=left| Mohamed Houmer || THAI FIGHT Chiang Mai 2017 || Chang Mai, Thailand || KO || 1 || 2:45
|- style="background:#cfc;"
| 2017-11-29 || Win ||align=left| Kiatchai Phuket Top Team || Bangla Stadium || Phuket, Thailand || KO || 3 || 
|-
! style=background:white colspan=9 |
|- style="background:#fbb;"
| 2016-10-23|| Loss ||align=left| Sean Kearney || THAI FIGHT Air Race 1  || Bangkok, Thailand || Decision || 3 || 3:00
|- style="background:#cfc;"
| 2014-10-25 || Win ||align=left| Too Too || THAI FIGHT 2014: 1st Round || Bangkok, Thailand || Decision || 3 || 3:00
|- style="background:#cfc;"
| 2014-09-20 || Win ||align=left| Chanajon P.K. Saenchai Muaythaigym || THAI FIGHT WORLD BATTLE 2014: Vietnam || Ho Chi Minh City, Vietnam || KO || 1 ||
|-  style="background:#fbb;"
| 2014-03-29|| Loss ||align=left| Jomthong Chuwattana || MAX Muay Thai 7 || Bangkok, Thailand || Decision || 3 || 3:00
|-  style="background:#fbb;"
| 2013-10-27|| Loss ||align=left| Christopne Pruvost || THAI FIGHT Kard Chuek || Bangkok, Thailand || Decision || 3 || 3:00
|- style="background:#fbb;"
| 2013-10-17|| Loss ||align=left| Matheus Robin || Mega Fight - The Extreme 8  || Hong Kong || Decision || 3 || 3:00
|-  style="background:#fbb;"
| 2013-07-24 || Loss ||align=left| Saenchai || Toyota Vigo Marathon Tournament, Final || Phitsanulok, Thailand || Decision || 3 || 3:00
|-
! style=background:white colspan=9 |
|- style="background:#cfc;"
| 2013-07-24 || Win ||align=left| John Michel Pierre || Toyota Vigo Marathon Tournament, Semi Finals || Phitsanulok, Thailand || TKO || 2 ||
|- style="background:#cfc;"
| 2013-07-24 || Win ||align=left| Leonard Nganga|| Toyota Vigo Marathon Tournament, Quarter Finals || Phitsanulok, Thailand || Decision || 3 || 300
|-  style="background:#fbb"
| 2013-04-19 || Loss ||align=left| Yodsanklai Fairtex || THAI FIGHT EXTREME 2013: Pattaya || Pattaya, Thailand || TKO || 2 ||
|-
| colspan=9 | Legend:

References

External links

1993 births
Living people
Uzbekistani kickboxers
Uzbekistani Lethwei practitioners
Uzbekistani Muay Thai practitioners
Sportspeople from Tashkent